Palamaner or Palamaneru is a town in Chittoor district of the Indian state of Andhra Pradesh. It is the mandal headquarters of Palamaner mandal and Palamaner Revenue Division

Geography
It has an average elevation of 683 meters (2,244 ft). Being close to Karnataka and Tamil Nadu state borders, people here bear a mixed culture.

Education
The primary and secondary school education is imparted by government, aided and private schools, under the School Education Department of the state.

Politics 
Palamaner is an Assembly constituency in Andhra Pradesh.

References

Towns in Chittoor district
 Mandal headquarters in Chittoor district